Death Sentence (also titled Murder One) is a 1974 American made-for-television crime film directed by E.W. Swackhamer and starring Cloris Leachman and Laurence Luckinbill.  It is based on the 1968 novel After the Trial by Eric Roman.

Plot
A juror in a murder case begins to believe that the man on trial is innocent of the crime, and then discovers that the real killer is actually her own husband.

Cast
Cloris Leachman as Susan Davies
Laurence Luckinbill as Don Davies
Nick Nolte as John Healy
Alan Oppenheimer as Lubell
William Schallert as Tanner
Yvonne Wilder as Elaine Croft
Herb Voland as Lowell hayes
Hope Summers as Emily Boylan
Peter Hobbs as Judge
Doreen Lang as Mrs. Cottard
Murray MacLeod as Martin Gorman
Bing Russell as Trooper
Meg Wyllie as Mae Sinclair
Lew Brown as Mr. Bowman
C.J. Hincks as Marilyn Healy
Vernon Weddle as Hayden
Robert Cleaves as Dr. Braun
Jack Collins as Willis Wright
Dick Winslow as Barman
Pat Patterson as Jury Guard
Morgan Englund as Bobby
Dinah Englund as Pru

See also
 List of American films of 1974

References

External links
 

American Broadcasting Company television specials
American television films
Television shows based on American novels
Films based on American novels
1974 television films
1974 films
1974 drama films
Films scored by Laurence Rosenthal
Films directed by E. W. Swackhamer
1970s English-language films